During the Cold War, NATO and the Warsaw Pact both had large tank formations present in Europe.

The following gives the number of armoured formations and tank strength as of 1981/1982 for Warsaw Pact and NATO member countries. These include formations and vehicles deployed outside Europe, such as in North America or the Asiatic USSR.

NATO 
Grand Total: 35,000+ Tanks

West Germany 

German Army Formations
 6 Tank Divisions (Panzerdivisionen) (Mostly had Leopard 2s, but in very little amount.)
 4 Armored Infantry Divisions (Panzergrenadierdivisionen) (Mainly had Leopard 1s, due the scarcity of Leopard 2s)
 1 Mountain Division (Gebirgsdivision)
 6 Home Defense Tank Brigades (Heimatschutz – Panzerbrigaden) (Armed with older M48A2C/ M48A2G2s.)
 6 Home Defense Armored Infantry Brigades (Heimatschutz – Panzergrenadierbrigaden (not complete)

Total: 4000+ tanks 

(Total: 5000+ including Jagdpanzer)

United States 

Formations as of 1981/1983
 4 Armored Divisions (1st, 2nd, 3rd, and 4th)(Most of them had M60A3s and each had about 150 M1 tanks)
 6 Mechanized Divisions (Had mainly M1 Abrams Tanks)
 4 Infantry Divisions (1st, 2nd, 3rd, and 5th)
 1 Airborne Division (incl. 1 Tank Battalion) (Had 50 Sheridan tanks)
 1 independent Tank Brigade (194th Armored) (Had mostly M1s.)
 4 independent Infantry Brigades 
 3 Cavalry Regiments (Reconnaissance) (Generally only had 10–12 tanks, mainly Sheridans/ but some had M1s)
 3 ACAV Regiments (2nd, 3rd and 11th ACAV)
 3 Tank Battalions (most had M60A1 RISE Passive) Marines 
 ? Tank Battalions National Guard (Reserve)

Number of tanks
 1,825 M48A5 MBT
 1,555 M60 MBT
 7,000 M60A1 MBT
 540 M60A2 MBT (But Reserve on 1976)
 4,000+M60A3 MBT
 3,000+ M1 Abrams MBT
 400 M551 Sheridan AR/AAV (330 extra for training purposes)
 575 M60A1 ERA MBT with the Marines

Total: 19,225+ tanks (min. 330 for training only)

CENTAG mainly consisted of the US 5th and 7th corps along with more mech divisions. The US army had a fair amount of tanks, making up for the shortcomings of NATO tank numbers.

France 
In 1984 :

Formations
 6 Tank divisions (divisions blindées – the 2nd, 7th, 10th in France, the 1st, 3rd and 5th in West Germany)
 4 Light Armoured Divisions – the 6th, 9th, 12th, 14th
 2 Mechanised Infantry Divisions – the 8th and 15th

Total: 1,868 tanks

United Kingdom 

Formations
 3 Armoured divisions in 1981 (1st, 2nd, 3rd and 4th) as part of the British Army of the Rhine.

Total: 1,901 tanks and armoured cars

Before the 1980s, equipment included the Conqueror tank (1955–1966) and FV4101 Charioteer (TA 1950s). Initially containing three armoured divisions, BAOR was reformed by 1960 into three mixed divisions and additional brigade groups. Then in the 1970s, as four smaller armoured divisions before reorganization as 3 armoured divisions in 1981–83.

Turkey 
As of 1981/83:

Formations
 1 Tank Division
 2 Mechanised Infantry Divisions
 14 Infantry Divisions (some with tank battalions attached)

Total: 3,500 Tanks

Italy 

As of 1981/82:
Formations
 5 Armored Brigades (two tank battalion each, 49 tanks each battalion))
 9 Mechanized Brigades (one 49 tanks battalion each)
 4 Motorized Brigades (one armored battalion each, with 33 tanks)
 2 Armored Carabinieri (gendarmerie) battalions
 2 Armored independent battalions
 4 Recce independent battalions (31 tanks each)
 Armored Troops School with the 31st Tank battalion
 Armored Training Camp with the 1st Armored Regiment 
Number of tanks
 900 MBT Leopard 1
 300 MBT M60A1
 550 MBT M47 Patton (remaining of original 1,500)

Total: 1,620 tanks

Netherlands 
As of 1981/82:
Formations
 1 armoured division
 2 mechanised divisions (1 of which reserve)
Number of Tanks
 468 MBT Leopard 1
 330 MBT Centurion tank
 120 light tank AMX 13/105

Total: 918 tanks

Denmark 
As of 1983:
Formations
 1 Mechanised Division (Jutland)The Jutland division/Jyske division.
 1 Light Battlegroup/Jyske kampgruppe. (Jutland) 3 Motorized battalions with 8 Centurion tanks with 105mm guns and a battalion of 24 105mm light howitzers.
 2 Independent Mechanised Brigades (Zealand)
 4 Light Battlegroups (Zealand)Each battlegroup with 8–10 Centurion with 84mm gun and a field artillery battalion. Plus motorized infantry battalions.
 1 Battlegroup (Bornholm) Motorized infantry and a battalion of 24 light artillery pieces. 
 1 Battlegroup/Kampgruppe Funen/ 2 motorized infantry battalions. Light artillery battalion of 24 howitzers 105mm.

Number of Tanks
JutlandThe Jutland Division/Jyske division.
 120 MBT Leopard 1A3 (40 in each Brigade x3)
 18  light tank M41 Walker Bulldog (Recon Battalion)
 50 Centurion tank Mk.V with 84 mm gun in the tank destroyer battalion of the division. 10 Centurion with 105mm gun with the motorized infantry battalion of the Jutland division. 6x Anti-tank Squadrons in reserve in four regions and one Light-Battlegroupe with 10 centurion with 105mm gun. In each 3 regions of Jutland there was an infantry battalion. 1 of 3 also with a battalion of light howitzers. Jyske Kampgruppe/Jutland battlegroup with its tanks and artillery was to assist each region if overwhelmed and the strongest force in Jutland. The Jutland division was in Sleswig/Holstein.
Zealand
 90 MBT Centurion tank MK.V2 with 105 mm L7A1 gun (50 in one Brigade, 40 in the other. All with 105mm gun)
 36 Centurion tank MK.V with 84 mm gun (4 tank Squadrons in 4 Light-Battlegroups)
 18  light tank M41 Walker Bulldog (Recon Battalion)
 Region IV Funen. Battlegroup 20 centurion with 84mm gun.
Bornholm
 16 light tank M41 Walker Bulldog (1 Light Tank Squadron and 1 Recon Squadron)
 Possibly a number om M10 tank destroyers, when taking absolutely all reserves into account. I have not listed a number
Total:  350 tanks

Belgium 
As of 1981/82:
Formations
 1 Armoured Brigade (17 Ps Bde – Spich-Altenrath)
 3 Mechanised Brigades (1 PsInf Bde – Leopoldsburg, 4 PsInf Bde – Soest, 7 PsInf Bde – Marche-En-Famenne)
 1 Reserve Mechanised Brigade
Number of tanks
 334 MBT Leopard 1
 62 MBT M47 Patton (reserve)
 136 light tank FV101 Scorpion
 154 light tank FV107 Scimitar
 80 tank destroyer Kanonenjagdpanzer

Total: 766 tanks

Canada 
As of 1981/82:
Formations
 1 Mechanized Brigade (4 Canadian Mechanized Brigade Group, based in Germany)
 2 Motorized Brigades (1 Canadian Brigade Group and 5e Groupe-brigade du Canada, both based in Canada with NATO taskings to Europe. 1CBG provided personnel for REFORGER and 5GBC as the CAST Canadian Air-Sea Transportable Brigade Group earmarked for service in Norway). 
 114 MBT Leopard 1
 195 AVGP Cougar (amphibious, direct Fire Support Vehicle (Wheeled) FSV(W) variant of the Canadian built Armoured Vehicle General Purpose AVGP based on the Swiss MOWAG 6X6 Piranaha hull with 76 mm gun in British FV101 Scorpion Tank Turret).

The Leopards and Cougars came into service in the late 1970s and replaced 274 Centurion Tanks used by Royal Canadian Armoured Corps units (The Canadian Centurion tanks served in Germany for 25 years, from January 1952 to January 1977).

Total: 114 MBT (+195 FSV) = 309 tanks

Norway 
As of 1981/82:
Formations
 Independent Armoured Squadrons
Number of tanks
 78 MBT Leopard 1
 38 MBT M48 Patton
 70 light tank NM-116 (upgraded M24 Chaffee)

Total: 186 tanks

Portugal 
As of 1981/82:
Formations
 1 Tank Regiment
 2 Cavalry Regiments
Number of tanks
 34 MBT M47 Patton
 30 MBT M48 Patton
 Up to 16 light tank M24 Chaffee

Total: ~80 tanks

Greece 
As of 1981/82:
Formations
 1 Armoured Division
 2 Independent Armoured Brigades

Total: 1,310 tanks

Spain 

Members of NATO from 30 May 1982:
Formations
 1 Armoured Division
 1 Mechanised Division
 3 Armoured Cavalry Brigades
 1 Light Cavalry Regiment
Number of tanks
 340 MBT M47 Patton
 110 MBT M48 Patton
 200 MBT AMX-30
 180 light tank M41 Walker Bulldog

Total: 830 tanks

Warsaw Pact 

Grand Total: 59,100+ Tanks

USSR 

Formations
As of 1981/82 the Soviet Ground Forces had:
 36 Tank Divisions, including six Tank Armies with four tank divisions each.
 85 Mechanised Infantry Divisions
 6 Airborne Divisions
 2 Naval Infantry Divisions
 3 Naval Infantry Brigades

Tank strength
 20000+ Medium Tanks, T-54/55 and T-62, 1000+ T-10A/M Heavy tanks (reserve) T-10 / T-10M / T-54 / T-55 / T-62
 15,000 MBT T64A/B, T-72 Ural/T-72A, T-80/T-80B T-64 / T-72 / T-80
 870 amphibious Reconnaissance Tanks PT-76/85 PT-76 (Plavayushchiy Tank)
 1,800 med. tank T-34 (At the Chinese border – most used for driver training; withdrawn in 1979)

Total: 40000 tanks

East Germany 

As of 1981/82:
Formations
 2 Tank Division
 4 Mechanised Infantry Divisions
Number of tanks
 1,500 MBT T-54 / T-55 / T-72 (further 1600 tanks stored)
 120 Reconnaissance tanks PT-76

Total: 1,620+ tanks

Poland 

As of 1981/82:
Formations
 5 Tank Divisions
 8 Mechanised Infantry Divisions
 1 Amphibious Assault Division
Number of Tanks
 3,400  T-54 / T-55 MBT
 30 T-72 MBT
 130 PT-76 Armored Reconnaissance tanks

Total: 4,010 tanks

Czechoslovakia 
As of 1980
Formations
 7 Tank Divisions (2 on full numbers, 3 on reduced numbers, 2 created by mobilization)
 8 Motor-Rifle Divisions (3 on full numbers, 2 on reduced numbers, 3 created by mobilization)
Number of Tanks as of year 1980
 31 T-72
 1,960 T-55
 1,804 T-54
 428 T-34

Total in 1980: 4,223 tanks

Bulgaria 
As of 1981/82
Formations
 5 Tank Brigades (in Sofia, Kazanlak, Karlovo, Sliven and Aytos)
 8 Motor Rifle Divisions
Number of Tanks
 1,800 MBT T-54 / T-55
 250 MBT T-62
 100 medium tank T-34
 250 light tank PT-76

Total: 2,400 tanks

Hungary 
As of 1981/82
Formations
 1 Tank Division (in Tata)
 5 Motor Rifle Divisions (in Gyöngyös, Kiskunfélegyháza, Zalaegerszeg, Kaposvár and Nyíregyháza)
Number of Tanks
 1,000 MBT T-54 / T-55
 100 light tanks PT-76

Total: 1,100 tanks

Romania 
As of 1981/82
Formations
 2 Tank Divisions (in Targu-Mures and Bucuresti)
 8 Mechanised Infantry Divisions (in Iasi, Braila, Constanta, Bucuresti, Craiova, Timișoara, Oradea and Dej)
Number of Tanks
  935 medium tanks T-34-85
  31  MBT T-72 Ural-1
  758 MBT T-55,
  121 MBT TR-77 

Total: 1,845 tanks

Other

Sweden 
As of ca 1980
Formations
 4 Armoured Brigades, type PB 63
 1 Armoured Brigade, type Gotland
 1 Mechanized Brigade, type MekB 10 (under development)
 2 Independent Armoured Battalions, I 19/P 5
Number of tanks
 264 MBT Stridsvagn 103 (72 per brigade, plus two independent battalions with 24 each)
 192 MBT Centurion tank (72 per brigade, plus a future mechanized brigade with 48)

The Swedish army was in the process of forming a mechanized brigade, type MekB 10, which became active in 1983/84. This brigade was only equipped with 48 MBT's (Centurions) compared to the 72 MBT's of the regular armoured brigades, but instead received 24 Infanterikanonvagn 91 infantry support vehicles.

Total: 456 tanks

Footnotes

References 
 Armed Forces 1981/82 In: The Military Balance of the International Institute for Strategic Studies  London  (Bernard & Graefe Verlag, Munich 1982.)
 
 

Tank units and formations
NATO
Warsaw Pact
Tan